Malta Majjistral, also known as the North Western Region, was a region of Malta between 1993 and 2009. It was located on the main island of Malta, bordering Malta Xlokk. The name referred to the Mistral wind, which is Majjistral in Maltese.

The region was created by the Local Councils Act of 30 June 1993, and was integrated into the constitution in 2001. It was abolished by Act No. XVI of 2009, and it was divided into the Northern Region, Central Region and part of the Southern Region.

Subdivision

Districts
The region included 3 statistical districts:
Northern
Northern Harbour
Western

Local councils
Malta Majjistral included 29 local councils:

 Attard
 Balzan
 Birkirkara
 Dingli
 Għargħur
 Gżira
 Ħamrun
 Iklin
 Lija
 Mdina (Città Notabile)
 Mellieħa
 Mġarr
 Mosta
 Msida
 Mtarfa
 Naxxar
 Pembroke
 Pietà
 Qormi (Città Pinto)
 Rabat
 San Ġiljan
 San Ġwann
 San Pawl il-Baħar
 Santa Venera
 Siġġiewi (Città Ferdinand)
 Sliema
 Swieqi
 Ta' Xbiex
 Żebbuġ (Città Rohan)

References

Former regions of Malta
1993 establishments in Malta
2009 disestablishments in Malta